Pseudochaenichthys is a monotypic genus of marine ray-finned fish belonging to the family Channichthyidae, the crocodile icefishes. Its only member is Pseudochaenichthys georgianus, the South Georgia icefish, which is found in the Southern Ocean.

Taxonomy
Pseudochaenichthys was first described as a genus in 1937 by the English ichthyologist John Roxborough Norman when he was describing its only species Pseudochaenichthys georgianus. The type locality of P. georgianus is South Georgia Island. The genus name is a compound of pseudo which means "false" and Chaenichthys, an alternative spelling for Channichthys, probably an allusion to its similarity of fishes in that genus. The specific name georgianus means that it belongs to (South) Georgia.

Description
Pseudochaenichthys, the South Georgia icefish, is a dark greyish-green species with blackish first dorsal and pelvic fins. The pelvic fins have white outer borders. The dorsal fin has 7 to 9 spines and 28 to 32 soft rays while the anal fin has 27 to 31 soft rays. There is a forward curving spine on the snout, a projecting lower jaw and there are 4 to 5 spines on the operculum. There are 3 lateral lines which do not have any bony plates on them. It has wide, fan shaped pelvic fins , the first and second dorsal fins are clearly separated and the caudal fin is rounded.

Distribution and habitat
Pseudochaenichthys georgianus is known only from the waters off the northern Antarctic Peninsula and the Scotia Sea.

Biology
Pseudochaenichthys georgianus adults feed mainly on krill, especially Antarctic krill (Euphasia superba) and fishes, mainly channichthyids and nototheniids) . This species is a synchronous spawner and spawning takes place in autumn, with the eggs hatching from August to October.

Fisheries
Pseudochaenichthys georgianus is of minor importance to commercial fisheries, being a regular bycatch species in trawls.

References

Channichthyidae
Monotypic fish genera
Fish of the Southern Ocean
Fauna of South Georgia and the South Sandwich Islands
Fish described in 1937
Taxa named by John Roxborough Norman